Florence Murray may refer to:

 Florence K. Murray (1916–2004), Rhode Island politician and judge
 Florence J. Murray, Canadian medical doctor, missionary, and professor